The following is a list of episodes from the series Apple & Onion.

Series overview

Episodes

Pilot (2016)

Season 1 (2018–20)

Season 2 (2020–21)

Shorts

References

Lists of American children's animated television series episodes
Lists of British animated television series episodes
Lists of Cartoon Network television series episodes